Jonas Finn-Olsson (born 5 November 1971) is a retired Swedish ice hockey player. Finn-Olsson was part of the Djurgården Swedish champions' team of 2001. Finn-Olsson made 45 Elitserien appearances for Djurgården.

References

Swedish ice hockey players
Djurgårdens IF Hockey players
1971 births
Living people